Hylenaea praecelsa is a species of flowering plant in the family Celastraceae, native to Costa Rica, Panama, western South America, northern Brazil, French Guiana, and Suriname. A climber, it has large seeds that are dropped in the dry season.

References

Celastraceae
Flora of Costa Rica
Flora of Panama
Flora of western South America
Flora of North Brazil
Flora of French Guiana
Flora of Suriname
Plants described in 1940